Mamado Leisabido Angaobido (English: The Mother The Maiden The Mad Lady) is a 2010 Indian Meitei language film directed by Romi Meitei and produced by Jenny Khurai, under the banner of Ima Sana Chingjroibi Films. It stars Kamala Saikhom and Gokul Athokpam in the lead roles. It is based on Khaidem Pramodini's play of the same title.

Synopsis
The movie narrates a tragic tale of Sushila's life. Fate separates Sushila from both her parents. Like an uprooted tree with no firm ground to hold, the unhealthy environment surrounding her gradually influence and affect Sushila. She starts to lose her line of thoughts. This leads her to be perceived as a mad lady by the people around her. A compassionate psychiatrist helps Sushila regain her status in the society.

Cast
 Kamala Saikhom as Sushila Saikhom
 Gokul Athokpam as Psychiatrist
 Gurumayum Priyogopal as Nando, Sushila's father
 Huirem Seema as Lalita, Nando's first wife
 Thoudam Ongbi Modhubala as Thaballei, Nando's second wife
 Heisnam Ongbi Indu as Lalita's mother
 Takhellambam Lokendra as Tomal
 Benu as Tomal's wife
 Boby as Dr. Suresh
 Bala Hijam (Special Appearance)
 Ratan as Sushila's stepfather
 Taminna
 Rojesh
 Lakshmikanta
 Hollen as Thaballei's son
 Bicky as Thaballei's son

Accolades

Soundtrack
Tomba Thangjam composed the soundtrack for the film and Romi Meitei wrote the lyrics. The songs are titled Laibakka Khatnaraba Mapokse and Eigi Pukning Leikolse.

References

External links
 

2010s Meitei-language films
2010 films